Christian Hjelm originating from Vestbjerg, Nordjylland, Denmark is a Danish singer and guitar player who has developed a solo career and has released a number of singles and had his debut album Før Vi Blev Lette recorded at Studio-R in Copenhagen and released on 3 September 2012 on Playground Music record label.

He is most famous for being the vocalist and guitar player for the Danish indie rock-band Figurines that has released four studio albums and 3 EPs.

On 22 November 2008, Christian Hjelm gave a live concert in tribute to The Beatles' White Album and called his own concert "The White Concert" that included "Martha My Dear" from the Beatles. In 2012, he collaborated with Nikolaj Nørlund in the album Alt sammen, lige nu.

Discography

Albums
Solo

with Figurines
2004: Shake a Mountain
2005: Skeleton
2007: When the Deer Wore Blue (DEN No. 20 in Danish Albums Chart)
2010: Figurines

Singles
2012: "Lang vej igen" / "Scenen skifter nu"

References

External links
Official website

Living people
Year of birth missing (living people)
21st-century Danish musicians
21st-century Danish  male singers